Pseudocatharylla submikengella is a moth in the family Crambidae. It was described by Stanisław Błeszyński in 1964. It is found in Angola and the Democratic Republic of the Congo.

References

Crambinae
Moths described in 1964